Renie Isabel Riano (August 7, 1899 – July 3, 1971) was an English-born American actress who, with the exception of the Jiggs and Maggie comedies, had minor roles in 1940s and 1950s films. She was sometimes credited as Reine Riano, Renee Riano, or Rene Riano.

Biography
Riano's parents were Robert and Irene Riano of vaudeville's popular Four Rianos acrobatic act, an eccentric acrobat act which toured the world in vaudeville, variety and music halls.

In 1918, she married an American, John W. Neil in New Jersey and, thereby became an American citizen. Their daughter, Jane, was born in Philadelphia in 1919.

Filmography

Film

 Music Box Revue (1923, Pathé film of C. B. Cochran's London production including Riano performing with Ethelind Terry)
 My Dear Miss Aldrich (1937) - Maid (uncredited)
 Tovarich (1937) - Madame Courtois
 You're a Sweetheart (1937) - Mrs. Hepplethwaite
 Outside of Paradise (1938) - Ellen
 Women Are Like That (1938) - Hotel Maid (uncredited)
 Men Are Such Fools (1938) - Mrs. Pinkel
 Four's a Crowd (1938) - Mrs. Jenkins
 The Road to Reno (1938) - Woman Bailiff
 The Storm (1938) - Woman Passenger (uncredited)
 Spring Madness (1938) - Mildred
 Strange Faces (1938) - Mrs. Keller, Landlady
 Nancy Drew... Detective (1938) - Effie Schneider
 Thanks for Everything (1938) - Mrs. Sweeney
 Wings of the Navy (1939) - Train Passenger (uncredited)
 Nancy Drew... Reporter (1939) - Effie Schneider (uncredited)
 Tail Spin (1939) - Chick's Pilot Girlfriend (uncredited)
 Wife, Husband and Friend (1939) - Mrs. Craig
 Dodge City (1939) - President of Prairie League (uncredited)
 Mr. Moto in Danger Island (1939) - Librarian (uncredited)
 Tell No Tales (1939) - Olga - Maid (uncredited)
 Bridal Suite (1939) - Mrs. Pujol (uncredited)
 Nancy Drew... Trouble Shooter (1939) - Effie Schneider
 The Women (1939) - Ugly Saleswoman (uncredited)
 Nancy Drew and the Hidden Staircase (1939) - Effie Schneider
 Honeymoon in Bali (1939) - Head Saleswoman (uncredited)
 Disputed Passage (1939) - Mrs. Riley
 Day-Time Wife (1939)  - Miss Briggs
 The Honeymoon's Over (1939) - Annie
 Oh Johnny, How You Can Love (1940) - 'Junior's' Mother (uncredited)
 The Shop Around the Corner (1940) - Customer (uncredited)
 The Man Who Wouldn't Talk (1940) - Lilly Wigham
 High School (1940) - Miss Grace (uncredited)
 The Ghost Comes Home (1940) - Sarah Osborn
 The Doctor Takes a Wife (1940) - Telegraph Operator (uncredited)
 Those Were the Days! (1940) - Hysterical Woman on Streetcar (uncredited)
 Kit Carson (1940) - Miss Pilchard
 A Little Bit of Heaven (1940) - Mrs. Dixon
 Li'l Abner (1940) - Sarah Jones
 Remedy for Riches (1940) - Mrs. Gattle
 Adam Had Four Sons (1941) - Photographer
 You're the One (1941) - Aunt Emma, aka Faro Fanny
 Ziegfeld Girl (1941) - Annie
 Affectionately Yours (1941) - Mrs. Snell
 Ice-Capades (1941) - Karen Vadja
 Unfinished Business (1941) - Ross's Secretary (uncredited)
 The Smiling Ghost (1941) - Homely Woman (uncredited)
 You Belong to Me (1941) - Minnie
 They Died with Their Boots On (1941) - Nurse (uncredited)
 Whispering Ghosts (1942) - Meg (Stella)
 There's One Born Every Minute (1942) - Miss Aphrodite Phipps
 Blondie for Victory (1942) - Miss Clabber, Cookie's Babysitter (uncredited)
 The Man from Music Mountain (1943) - Christina Kellogg - Housekeeper
 Jam Session (1944) - Ms. Tobin
 Take It or Leave It (1944) - Mrs. Nellie Bramble (uncredited)
 None but the Lonely Heart (1944) - Flo (uncredited)
 Three Is a Family (1944) - Genevieve
 Can't Help Singing (1944) - Spinster Exiting Bathhouse (uncredited)
 A Song for Miss Julie (1945) - Eurydice Lannier
 The Picture of Dorian Gray (1945) - Lady Ruxton (uncredited)
 Anchors Aweigh (1945) - Studio Waitress (uncredited)
 River Gang (1945) - Mrs. Hawkins (uncredited)
 Club Havana (1945) - Mrs. Cavendish
 So Goes My Love (1946) - Emily
 Winter Wonderland (1946) - Mrs. Schuyler-Riggs
 Bad Bascomb (1946) - Lucy Lovejoy
 Bringing Up Father (1946) - Maggie Jiggs
 Jiggs and Maggie in Society (1947) - Maggie Jiggs
 The Time of Your Life (1948) - Lorene Smith (a blind date)
 An Act of Murder (1948) - Mrs. McGuinness (uncredited)
 Jiggs and Maggie in Court (1948) - Maggie Jiggs
 Jiggs and Maggie in Jackpot Jitters (1949) - Maggie Jiggs
 Jiggs and Maggie Out West (1950) - Maggie Jiggs
 As Young as You Feel (1951) - Harpist (uncredited)
 The Barefoot Mailman (1951) - Miss Emily (uncredited)
 Clipped Wings (1953) - WAF Sgt. Anderson
 Bikini Beach (1964) - Old Lady #2
 Pajama Party (1964) - Maid
 The Family Jewels (1965) - Airline Passenger #2
 Three on a Couch (1966) - Old Woman
 Fireball 500 (1966) - Marthy

Television
 Green Acres (1966) - Mrs. Granite - Molly Turggis (1969) - Stewardess Miss Jones (three different episodes)
 Mayberry RFD (1969) - Aunt Ella
 The Ghost & Mrs. Muir (1970) - Miss Stoddard

References

External links
 
 
 

American film actresses
English film actresses
1899 births
1971 deaths
20th-century American actresses
Actresses from London
British emigrants to the United States
20th-century English actresses
English people of American descent